"The Runaway" is a 1966 Australian television play. It aired on 19 October 1966 on the ABC as part of Wednesday Theatre.

It was written by John Croyston, who was better known as a producer; this was his first script for TV.

Plot
In a Sydney suburb, the two sons of a hard working pastry chef  of continental background are struggling with their own ambitions.

Cast
John Gray as Pop
Edward Hepple as Grandpa
Helen Morse as Jenny
Lynne Murphy as mother
Graham Dixon as George
Ken James as Fred
Bettina Smeaton as customer
Sandy Harbutt
Martin Harris

Reception
The critic for the Sydney Morning Herald said the play "was not a work of genius, but it showed promise. The characters were fairly well drawn and their conflicts were credible though mundane. Troubles lay between father, and sons, mother and sons, between one son and his girl of a more affluent class. But the treatment lay flat. At one stage half the cast was explaining:. "We don't seem—you know what I mean—to get along or ... You know what I mean — understand each other." The cast did not help. All were flatter than the script and John Gray as the father gave a banal effort... Why did Storry Walton put up with the noise in the studio? And why didn't someone edit out the slow patches in the writing? All his faults counted against him, Croyston deserved a better first night."

References

External links
 
 

1966 television plays
1966 Australian television episodes
1960s Australian television plays
Wednesday Theatre (season 2) episodes